Major-General Hugh Brownlow Hibbert  (10 December 1893 – 22 June 1988) was a senior British Army officer.

Military career
Born the son of Rear-Admiral Hugh Thomas Hibbert, Hibbert entered the Royal Military College, Sandhurst, from where he was commissioned as a second lieutenant into the King's Own Yorkshire Light Infantry, on 17 September 1913, shortly before the start of the First World War.

He was deployed to eastern Norway in April 1940 and saw action during the Norwegian campaign during the Second World War for which he was appointed a Companion of the Distinguished Service Order on 6 August 1940. After being withdrawn from Norway in June 1940, he became commander of the 148th Infantry Brigade in Northern Ireland May 1941 and was engaged in operations to protecting the province from German invasion. He went onto become General Officer Commanding 55th (West Lancashire) Infantry Division in the United Kingdom from May 1942 until August 1943, eventually retiring from the army in 1946, a year after the war ended.

References

Bibliography

External links
Generals of World War II

1893 births
1988 deaths
Companions of the Distinguished Service Order
King's Own Yorkshire Light Infantry officers
British Army personnel of World War I
People educated at Uppingham School
British Army generals of World War II
Graduates of the Royal Military College, Sandhurst
British World War I prisoners of war
People from Reading, Berkshire
British Army major generals
Military personnel from Reading, Berkshire